Fiona Meade (born 30 April 1981) is an Irish professional racing cyclist. She rode in the women's road race at the 2015 UCI Road World Championships.

References

External links

1981 births
Living people
Irish female cyclists
Place of birth missing (living people)